The 1994 NCAA men's volleyball tournament was the 25th annual tournament to determine the national champion of NCAA men's collegiate volleyball. The single elimination tournament was played at the Allen County War Memorial Coliseum in Fort Wayne, Indiana during May 1994.

Penn State defeated UCLA in the final match, 3–2 (9–15, 15–13, 4–15, 15–12, 15–12), to win their first national title. They became the first champions in tournament history to not be from California. The Nittany Lions (26–3) were coached by Tom Peterson.

Penn State's Ramón Hernández was named the tournament's Most Outstanding Player. Hernández, along with five other players, comprised the All-Tournament Team.

Qualification
Until the creation of the NCAA Men's Division III Volleyball Championship in 2012, there was only a single national championship for men's volleyball. As such, all NCAA men's volleyball programs, whether from Division I or Division II were eligible. A total of 4 teams were invited to contest this championship.

Tournament bracket 
Site: Allen County War Memorial Coliseum, Fort Wayne, Indiana

All tournament team 
 Ramón Hernández, Penn State (Most outstanding player)
Byron Schneider, Penn State
Ed Josefoski, Penn State
Jeff Nygaard, UCLA
Erik Sullivan, UCLA
Paul Nihipali, UCLA

See also 
 NCAA Men's National Collegiate Volleyball Championship
 NCAA Women's Volleyball Championships (Division I, Division II, Division III)

References

NCAA Men's Volleyball Tournament
NCAA Men's Volleyball Championship
NCAA Men's Volleyball Championship
Ncaa Mens Volleyball Tournament
Volleyball in Indiana